Beneventum Plantation House, originally known as Prospect Hill Plantation, is a historic plantation house located near Georgetown, Georgetown County, South Carolina. It was built about 1750, and is a two-story, five bay, Georgian style house.  It features a one-story portico across the center two-thirds of the façade. The rear half of the house was added about 1800, with further rear additions made probably early-20th century. It was the home of Christopher Gadsden, a prominent statesmen and soldier of the American Revolution, the originator of the “Don’t Tread on Me” flag, and Federalist Party leader in the early national period.

It was listed on the National Register of Historic Places in 1988.
It is now a private residence with no visitation. There is a state historical marker on the public right of way on Beneventum Road.

References

External links

Plantation houses in South Carolina
Houses on the National Register of Historic Places in South Carolina
Houses completed in 1750
Georgian architecture in South Carolina
National Register of Historic Places in Georgetown County, South Carolina
Houses in Georgetown County, South Carolina